Tabua is a polished sperm whale tooth, an important cultural item in Fijian society.

Tabua or Tábua may also refer to:
 Tabua, Madeira, a parish in the district of Ribeira Brava
 Tábua Municipality, Coimbra District, Portugal